Wildlife Crime Control Bureau (WCCB) is a statutory body established by the Government of India under the Ministry of Environment, Forest and Climate Change to combat organised wildlife crime. The Wild Life (Protection) Amendment Act, 2006 provisions came in to force on 6 June 2007. It became operational in the year 2008.

WCCB won the prestigious 2010 Clark R. Bavin Wildlife Law Enforcement Awards for its outstanding work on wildlife law enforcement in the country, which was received by Ramesh K Pandey, Deputy Director, on behalf of WCCB. UNEP has also awarded WCCB with Asia Environment Enforcement Award, 2018.

WCCB is also partnering with United Nations University and CIESIN-Earth Institute at Columbia University through the Wildlife Enforcement Monitoring System Initiative.

See also
Hunting license
List of endangered animals in India

References

External links
 

Specialist law enforcement agencies of India
Wildlife conservation in India
Wildlife smuggling
Crime prevention
Indian intelligence agencies
2008 establishments in Delhi
Government agencies established in 2008
Organisations based in Delhi